The Baring crisis or the Panic of 1890 was an acute recession.  Although less serious than other panics of the era, it is the nineteenth century’s most famous sovereign debt crisis, and the 17th largest decline in U.S. stock market history.

Background
The crisis was precipitated by the near insolvency of Barings Bank in London. Barings, led by Edward Baring, 1st Baron Revelstoke, faced bankruptcy in November 1890 due mainly to excessive risk-taking on poor investments in Argentina. Argentina itself suffered severely in the recession of 1890 with its real GDP falling by 11 percent between 1890 and 1891, An international consortium assembled by William Lidderdale, governor of the Bank of England, including Rothschilds and most of the other major London banks, created a fund to guarantee Barings' debts, thereby averting a larger depression. Nathan Rothschild  remarked that if this had not happened, perhaps the entire private banking system of London would have collapsed which would have caused an economic catastrophe.

The international financial distrust generated with this crisis burst the bubble in the Brazilian economy, which had been inflating since the previous decade, bringing forward its expected end and seeing a Brazilian financial crisis, which in turn along with Argentine and Uruguayan crises slashed repatriations and short-term investment by European immigrants from Latin America to their countries of origin, affecting the region significantly in the 1890s.

See also

 The historical novel Stone's Fall by Iain Pears. The Panic of 1890 is part of the historical setting and many historical persons appear as characters, although the novel's invention of secret conspiratorial events leading up to the crisis is fictional.
 An episode of the BBC drama series, Ripper Street, is set against the backdrop of the crisis.

References

Further reading
 
 Ziegler, Philip. The Sixth Great Power: A History of One of the Greatest of All Banking Families, the House of Barings, 1762-1929. Illustrated. 430 pp. New York: Alfred A. Knopf.

Economic crises in the United States
Economic history of the United Kingdom
1890s economic history
Financial crises
History of banking
1890 in economics
1890 in international relations
History of Argentina (1880–1916)
Recessions